Juphal is a village and former Village Development Committee that is now part of Thuli Bheri Municipality in Nepal. The 1991 Nepal census counted 1,513 persons in 300 households.

Transportation
Dolpa Airport lies in Juphal and offers flights to Nepalgunj.

References

External links
UN map of the municipalities of Dolpa District

Populated places in Dolpa District